Daniel Stephen Redmond (born 2 March 1991) is an English professional footballer, who plays as a midfielder for The New Saints. He has previously played for Wigan Athletic, Hamilton Academical and Carlisle United.

Career

Wigan Athletic
Redmond joined Wigan Athletic after being released by Everton in 2009. It was later explained that Redmond was released by Everton because he was too small. On 8 January 2011, he made his debut for Wigan, replacing James McArthur in the 80th minute of the FA Cup third round win at Hull City.

Loan Spells
He moved on loan to Scottish First Division club Hamilton Academical until the end of the season on 13 January 2012, making his debut on the same day in a 1–0 win against Partick Thistle. The next game, on 21 January 2012, Redmond scored his first goal for the club, in a 2–2 draw against Ayr United. Redmond would score four more goals against Livingston, Queen of the South, Ayr United (again) and Partick Thistle. Despite Hamilton being keen to extend his loan further, Redmond returned to his parent club.

On 8 February 2014, Redmond joined Carlisle United on a one-month loan. On 10 March 2014, he extended his loan spell with the Cumbrians for a further month until 5 April 2014. At the end of the season, Redmond was offered a new deal by Wigan, but he turned the offer down.

Hamilton Academical
Redmond signed a two-year contract with Hamilton Academical in June 2014. Upon making the move, Redmond revealed he turned down a big money contract from Wigan, in an effort to kick start his career.

He made his second debut for the club on 2 August 2014, as Hamilton beat Arbroath 2–1 in the Scottish League Cup. He scored his first league goal of the season against Partick Thistle in a 3–3 draw on 1 November 2014. Redmond said his first Hamilton goal since his return was "a long time coming" following his goal drought. Redmond scored his first goal of 2015, in a 5–0 win over rivals Motherwell. However, Redmond ended his first season at Hamilton Academical with 27 appearances and two goals in all competitions after suffering a knee injury that ruled him out for the entire season.

He was one of seven first-team players released by Hamilton at the end of the 2017–18 season.

The New Saints
After leaving Hamilton, Redmond signed for Welsh club The New Saints in May 2018.

Career statistics

Honours
Wigan Athletic
FA Cup: 2012–13

The New Saints
Cymru Premier: 2021–22

Personal life
He is the son of former Manchester City, Oldham Athletic and Bury footballer Steve Redmond.

References

External links

1991 births
Living people
English footballers
Association football midfielders
Everton F.C. players
Wigan Athletic F.C. players
Hamilton Academical F.C. players
Carlisle United F.C. players
The New Saints F.C. players
Footballers from Liverpool
Scottish Football League players
English Football League players
Scottish Professional Football League players
Cymru Premier players